Hebeloma alpinum is a species of mushroom in the family Hymenogastraceae. It was originally described from Switzerland by Favre as variety alpina of Hebeloma crustuliniforme; G. Bruchet raised it to species status in 1970.

See also
List of Hebeloma species

References

alpinum
Fungi described in 1955
Fungi of Europe